The Devil Is a Part-Timer! is a 2013 Japanese anime series based on the light novels of the same name written by Satoshi Wagahara. The anime is produced by White Fox and directed by Naoto Hosoda, with series composition by Masahiro Yokotani, character designs by Atsushi Ikariya, art direction by Yoshito Takamine and sound direction by Jin Aketagawa. The thirteen episode series premiered between April 4 and June 27, 2013 on Tokyo MX and was later aired on KBS, SUN-TV, BS Nittele, TV Aichi and AT-X. Pony Canyon released the series in Japan on six Blu-ray and DVD volumes starting on July 3, 2013. The anime was acquired by Funimation for streaming in North America. Manga Entertainment later licensed the series for distribution in the United Kingdom. This was followed by an acquisition by Siren Visual for home media distribution in Australia and New Zealand and online streaming on AnimeLab in 2014.

Other ending themes by Nano Ripe include  used in episode 5 and  used in episode 13.


Episode list

Home media
Pony Canyon began releasing the series in Japan on Blu-ray and DVD volumes starting on July 3, 2013. The complete series was released on Blu-ray and DVD format by Funimation on July 22, 2014, Siren Visual on September 17, 2014 and Manga Entertainment on October 27, 2014. These releases contained English and Japanese audio options and English subtitles.

Notes

References

2013 Japanese television seasons
The Devil Is a Part-Timer! episode lists